The 2019–20 Drake Bulldogs men's basketball team represented Drake University during the 2019–20 NCAA Division I men's basketball season. The Bulldogs were led by second-year head coach Darian DeVries. They played their home games at Knapp Center on campus in Des Moines, Iowa, as members of the Missouri Valley Conference (MVC). They finished the season 20–14, 8–10 in MVC play to finish in eighth place. They defeated Illinois State and Northern Iowa to advance to the semifinals of the MVC tournament where they lost to Bradley.

Previous season 
The Bulldogs finished the previous season 24–10 (12–6 MVC) to share of MVC regular season championship with Loyola–Chicago. The shared title was the Bulldogs' first since the 2007–08 season. After falling in the MVC tournament semifinals, they received a bid to the CollegeInsider.com Tournament where they lost in the first round to Southern Utah.

Offseason

Departures

Incoming transfers

2019 recruiting class

Roster

}
}

Schedule and results

|-
!colspan=9 style=| Exhibition

|-
!colspan=9 style=| Non-conference regular season

|-
!colspan=9 style=| MVC regular season

|-
!colspan=9 style=| MVC tournament

Source

References

Drake Bulldogs men's basketball seasons
Drake
Drake
Drake